Ordaklu may refer to:
 Ordaklu, Armenia
 Ordaklu, East Azerbaijan, Iran
 Ordaklu, Hamadan, Iran